Group B of the 2012 Fed Cup Americas Zone Group I was one of two pools in the Americas zone of the 2012 Fed Cup. Five teams competed in a round robin competition, with the top team and the bottom two teams proceeding to their respective sections of the play-offs: the top teams played for advancement to the World Group II Play-offs, while the bottom teams faced potential relegation to Group II.

Colombia vs. Venezuela

Paraguay vs. Bolivia

Colombia vs. Bolivia

Paraguay vs. Brazil

Colombia vs. Paraguay

Brazil vs. Venezuela

Paraguay vs. Venezuela

Brazil vs. Bolivia

Colombia vs. Brazil

Venezuela vs. Bolivia

See also
Fed Cup structure

References

External links
 Fed Cup website

2012 Fed Cup Americas Zone